Takla (and its variants Thecla and Tekle) is a name which is used as a surname and a given name. People with the name include:

Surname
Laila Takla, Coptic Egyptian politician, author, and promoter of Muslim-Christian relations
Philippe Takla (1915–2006), Lebanese lawyer, diplomat, politician and minister
Saleem Takla (1849–1892), co-founder of Al-Ahram with his brother Beshara Takla

Given name

First name
Thecla, Takla, or Tekla, saint of the early Christian Church
Takla Chamoun (born 1966), Lebanese actress
Tekle Haymanot, Ethiopian saint depicted with 6 wings
Takla Maryam, former Emperor of Ethiopia

Middle name
Abuna Takla Haymanot (died 1988), third Patriarch of the Ethiopian Orthodox Tewahido Church
Mara Takla Haymanot, former Emperor of Ethiopia

See also
 Murad Takla, someone who writes Bengali words using the Latin script in a bizarre or unorthodox fashion

Arabic-language surnames
Arabic feminine given names